The New Zealand Police Long Service and Good Conduct Medal is a long service award for full-time sworn officers and traffic officers of the New Zealand Police who have completed 14 years of service.

Criteria
The New Zealand Police Long Service and Good Conduct Medal may be awarded for 14 years full-time service as a sworn officer the New Zealand Police for service on or after 1 January 1976. The medal may also be awarded to full-time Traffic Officers who have met the length of service criteria for service on or after 1 July 1992. Clasps may be awarded to the medal for seven additional years of qualifying service.

Appearance
On the obverse is the crowned effigy of the Sovereign. The reverse bears a representation of St Edward's Crown, a sceptre, and sword resting on a cushion surrounded by an oak and fern frond wreath. This is surrounded by the inscription New Zealand Police—For Long Service and Good Conduct. In the centre is a narrow blue stripe bordered by stripes of white.

References

New Zealand Meritorious & Long Service Awards
Law enforcement awards and honors
Civil awards and decorations of New Zealand
Awards established in 1976
Long and Meritorious Service Medals of Britain and the Commonwealth